Italy v Brazil was a football match that took place between Brazil and Italy at Estadio Sarriá, Barcelona on 5 July 1982. It was the final second round group stage match for Group C in the 1982 FIFA World Cup. The match was won by Italy 3–2, with Italian striker Paolo Rossi scoring a hat-trick. The result eliminated Brazil from the tournament while Italy would go on to win it. The match has been described as one of the greatest in the history of association football.

Pre-match
Brazil had won all three of their first group stage matches, including comprehensive wins over Scotland (4–1) and New Zealand (4–0), and were the pre-tournament favourites. They were widely praised for their attacking style. In their initial second group stage match, Brazil beat South American rivals and World Cup holders Argentina 3–1.

Italy, meanwhile, had a slow start to the tournament, having drawn all three of their first group stage matches and finishing runners-up in their group; they had only qualified for the second group stage by having scored one more goal than third-placed Cameroon. However, in the first of their second round matches, Italy had recorded an impressive 2–1 victory over Argentina. Italy's striker Rossi had failed to score up to that point and there was considerable debate about whether he should be in the team, as he had only recently returned from a two-year ban following his involvement in the Totonero 1980 match-fixing scandal. Italy were forced to play for a win to reach the semi-final, due to their inferior goal difference.

Match

Summary
The match put Brazil's attack against Italy's defence, with the majority of the game played around the Italian area, with the Italian midfielders and defenders returning the repeated set volleys of Brazilian shooters such as Zico, Sócrates and Falcão. Italian centre back Claudio Gentile was assigned to mark Brazilian striker Zico, earning a yellow card and a suspension for the semi-final. Paolo Rossi opened the scoring when he headed in Antonio Cabrini's cross with just five minutes played. Sócrates equalised for Brazil seven minutes later. In the twenty-fifth minute Rossi stepped past Júnior, intercepted a pass from Cerezo across the Brazilians' goal, and drilled the shot home. The Brazilians threw everything in search of another equaliser, while Italy defended bravely. On 68 minutes, Falcão collected a pass from Júnior and as Cerezo's dummy run distracted three defenders, fired home from 20 yards out. Now Italy had gained the lead twice thanks to Rossi's goals, and Brazil had come back twice. At 2–2, Brazil would have been through on goal difference, but in the 74th minute, a poor clearance from an Italian corner kick went back to the Brazilian six-yard line where Rossi and Francesco Graziani were waiting. Both aimed at the same shot, Rossi connecting to get a hat trick and sending Italy into the lead for good. In the 86th minute Giancarlo Antognoni scored a fourth goal for Italy, but it was wrongly disallowed for offside. In the dying moments Dino Zoff made a miraculous save to deny Oscar a goal, ensuring that Italy advanced to the semi-final where they would meet Poland.

Details

Impact
The result was seen by many as not only a defeat for Brazil, but a defeat of their attacking philosophy by the less talented but more organised Italians.
This match has since then been labelled by the Brazilian press as the "Sarrià Tragedy" (Portuguese: Tragédia do Sarrià). The result of the match had a profound and lasting impact on Brazilian football and fundamentally changed its philosophy. According to Luizinho, Brazil's centre back in 1982, the defeat changed Brazilian coaches' way of thinking, leading to a new, destructive philosophy based on defensive, counterattacking football – the style of football played by the Italians against the Brazilians.

As described by sports journalist Tim Vickery: "For many Brazilian coaches, the failure of that 1982 side to win the World Cup (...) served as proof for ideas that had been kicking around for a while – starting with a 5–1 massacre at the hands of Belgium in 1963, confirmed by the defeat by Holland in the 1974 World Cup. The physical development of the game, it was thought, meant that traditional methods had to be revised. Brazilian players had to bulk up – Rubens Minelli, the most successful domestic coach of the 70s, wanted his team to be made up of six footers. And with less space on the field, the future of football lay in the counter attack, rather than elaborate attempts to pass through midfield." Tim Vickery continues by stating that "these thoughts have carried a lot of weight in the Brazilian game. They help explain why a succession of Brazil sides have caught the eye for explosive breaks down the flanks rather than for the succession of midfield triangles that enraptured Cappa and everyone else in 1982. When former Middlesbrough left-back Branco was in charge of Brazil’s youth sides, he told me that right from the start of the process the search for big, strong youngsters was a priority. Brazilian coaches, meanwhile, became fond of spouting the statistic that the chances of a goal are reduced if the move contains more than seven passes." He also earlier stated in 2006 that "had Brazil won the trophy in 1982 the team would be more than a fond memory. They might be the blueprint for future sides, because winners are always copied."

Further success in 1994 and 2002 in mostly pragmatic, less flashy styles cemented the new philosophy and practically buried the traditional passing style further into the past.

The rise of tiki-taka, a style of football partly based on moving triangles, positional interchange and intricate passing – highly reminiscent of the old Brazilian passing style, embodied by the 1982 team – has helped recover some of the prestige of the 1982 team in the country. The crushing defeat of the Brazilian counterattacking style by tiki-taka teams, namely the 4–0 defeat of Santos to Barcelona and the 7–1 Brazilian defeat to Germany at home at the World Cup in 2014 laid bare how Brazilian football had been left behind. As a result, the country's football philosophy has been slowly returning to the old intricate passing style in the last few years, as recent success by Grêmio and Flamengo have shown.

See also
Brazil–Italy football rivalry

References

1982 FIFA World Cup
1982
1981
FIFA World Cup matches
Italy
Italy at the 1982 FIFA World Cup
Football in Barcelona
1980s in Barcelona
Sports competitions in Barcelona
July 1982 sports events in Europe
Nicknamed sporting events